The Harrods Creek Baptist Church and Rev. William Kellar House was listed on the National Register of Historic Places in 1976.  The church and house are located northwest of Crestwood, Kentucky, on Old Brownsboro Rd.

The Harrods Creek Church, built in c.1810, is a simple stone building.  It faces north and has three windows on its east and west sides.

It is a three-bay, two-story stone house with a brick ell.

References

External links

Baptist churches in Kentucky
Houses on the National Register of Historic Places in Kentucky
Churches on the National Register of Historic Places in Kentucky
Churches completed in 1810
19th-century Baptist churches in the United States
Churches in Oldham County, Kentucky
Houses in Oldham County, Kentucky
National Register of Historic Places in Oldham County, Kentucky
Houses completed in 1807
1807 establishments in Kentucky
1810 establishments in Kentucky
Clergy houses in the United States